The Department of Power of West Bengal is a Bengal government ministry. It is a ministry mainly responsible for the fulfillment of the demand of electricity in the state. With the enhancement of the generating capacity, it is also emphasizing on the strengthening of transmission and distribution network, especially in rural Bengal. Development of a state-of-the-art Satellite Communication network with statewide coverage has already been undertaken for modernization of various management information systems which would result in betterment of consumer services by the various utilities in the state.

Ministerial Team 
The ministerial team is headed by the Cabinet Minister for Power, who may or may not be supported by Ministers of State. Civil servants are assigned to them to manage the ministers' office and ministry.

References 

West Bengal
Government agencies for energy (India)
Energy in West Bengal
Government of West Bengal
Government departments of West Bengal